The , abbreviated , is a community theater on the former premises of the Georg-August-Universität medical center.
The stage is situated in the former anatomical theater.

History 
The theater was founded by the drama section of the German Department in 1984.
Its primary mission is to give opportunities to students for training and hands-on experience in a theater.

The theater evolved to the largest student theater in Germany.
It has become one of the largest of its kind across Europe.

Venue 

The former operating room has two opposing straight elongated stands, east and west.
The rows of benches rise very steeply, allowing an unobstructed view.
The northern face of the building has a large window, that is usually covered with a black sheet of molton.
The southern gallery may be used for additional seats.
This arrangement then virtually creates a thrust stage.

There is no glass dome separating observers from the scene.
Unlike during an operation focused on one spot in the middle of the hall, actors can – and do – use the whole width and length of the stage.
This, combined with the bench structure, tend to give the theater an intimate atmosphere.

A separate staircase for the audience has been attached to the building's southwest.
While the stage level can be reached via an elevator, the gallery can not.
Nonetheless, the crew is determined to find means allowing everyone to attend shows.

A dressing room, a make-up room and a workshop, beside other facilities, are located laterally to the stage, underneath the stands and gallery.
Some productions used it as a stage for public audience, too.
However, the former barrel vault-like operating room is limited to 30 persons.
Yet it is accessible by wheelchair via ramps, as it is slightly below street level.

Properties and costumes are stored in the attic of an adjacent building, if they are not in use in current or upcoming productions.

Unfortunately this coincided with the 30-year anniversary of the theater.

In the course of building repairs a ventilation system has been built in into the 's own attic.
It helps managing excess heat emitted by a full house and lighting.

Operations 
Productions are shown en suite.
This cycle allows up to 12 productions to premiere per year, totaling about 130 shows.

Casts and crews are predominantly students, but a sizable number of the participants are university staff and towns-people as well.
Enrolled university students can obtain credits in some courses of studies.

Directors have to go through a vetting process, by being an Assistant Director for one production at the  first.
The remaining tasks have more or less formal requirements, but there is a culture of passing forward skills and knowledge:
Senior  affiliates instruct novices, who themselves may eventually become senior  members too.

There is only one position funded by the department, accompanied by some (student) assistants.
All participants are otherwise volunteers.
The admission pricing policy is non-profit, nonetheless subsidies and sponsoring support the budget.
Enrolled students of the Georg-August-Universität can attend shows for a compulsory flatrate.
A bar serving bottled drinks belongs to the theater's services.

Most plays are in German.
The "English drama workshop" stages a play in English once per year.
There have been productions incorporating German sign language, too.

There is no limit to the range of genres.
Classical plays as well as contemporary dramas are shown.
Since 2004 the theater also hosts a budding dramatists competition.

Due to the coronavirus pandemic the theater temporarily shut down its operations mid March 2020, like virtually all theaters in Germany.
All productions were put on hold and will be shown as soon as rehearsals become possible again.
Nonetheless, -related classes were still held, although predominately via distance teaching.

External links

References 

Theatres in Lower Saxony
Buildings and structures in Göttingen (district)
University of Göttingen
Amateur theatre
Event venues established in 1984
1984 establishments in Germany